P. Adams Sitney (born August 9, 1944 in New Haven, Connecticut), is a historian of American avant-garde cinema. He is known as the author of Visionary Film, one of the first books on the history of experimental film in the United States.

Life
Sitney attended Yale University, where he received an A.B. in Classics in 1967 and a Ph.D in Comparative Literature in 1980. He co-founded the Anthology Film Archives in 1970 and, along with Jonas Mekas, Peter Kubelka, Ken Kelman, and James Broughton, served as one of the members of the Anthology Film Archives Essential Cinema film selection committee. He is currently Professor of Visual Arts at the Lewis Center for the Arts at Princeton University.

Sitney was a fixture at New York University's doctoral program in its new Cinema Studies Department in 1970. Before moving to Princeton, he also taught at the Cooper Union for the Advancement of Science and Art. He has been a major critical leader and intellectual supporter of the New American Cinema avant-garde movement.

Four main techniques that Sitney identified for structural film are: fixed camera position; flicker effect; re-photography off the screen; and loop printing. These techniques were implemented by experimental filmmakers in the 1960s to create cinema "in which the shape of the whole film is pre-determined and simplified".

See also
Anthology Film Archives
Marjorie Keller
Jonas Mekas

References

External links
Visionary Film on Google Books
Full text of the book on Internet Archive
P. Adams Sitney on IMDb

1944 births
Living people
American film critics
Princeton University faculty
Experimental film
American film historians